The United States Senate Committee on the Budget was established by the Congressional Budget and Impoundment Control Act of 1974. It is responsible for drafting Congress's annual budget plan and monitoring action on the budget for the Federal Government. The committee has jurisdiction over the Congressional Budget Office. The committee briefly operated as a special committee from 1919 to 1920 during the 66th Congress, before being made a standing committee in 1974.

The current Chair is Rhode Island Senator Sheldon Whitehouse, and the Ranking Member is South Carolina Senator Lindsey Graham.

Contrasted with other committees
The Budget Committee should not be confused with the Finance Committee and the Appropriations Committee, both of which have different jurisdictions: The Finance Committee is analogous to the Ways and Means Committee in the House of Representatives; it has legislative jurisdiction in the areas of taxes, Social Security, Medicare, Medicaid and some other entitlements. The Appropriations Committee has legislative jurisdiction over appropriations bills, which provide funding for government programs.

While the budget resolution prepared by the Budget Committee sets out a broad blueprint for the Congress with respect to the total levels of revenues and spending for the government as a whole, these other Committees prepare bills for specific tax and spending policies.

118th Congress

Chairs, 1975–present

Historical membership rosters

117th Congress

Source:

116th Congress

115th Congress

114th Congress

113th Congress

112th Congress

111th Congress

110th Congress

109th Congress

Notes

References

External links
Official website (Archive)
Senate Budget Committee. Legislation activity and reports, Congress.gov.
Committee on the Budget, United States Senate, 1974-2006. Senate Document 109-24. 109th Congress, 2nd session, 2006.

Senate Committee on Budget
Budget
1974 establishments in Washington, D.C.
Organizations established in 1974